Kaspar Kögler (12 February 1838, Molsberg - 1 April 1923, Wiesbaden) was a German painter, illustrator and writer.

Life and work 

He was the third of seven children born to a farming family. Originally, their name was spelled Kegeler or Kegler. As the eldest son, he was expected to succeed his father, but he displayed a degree of artistic talent that led him on a different career path.

He left Munich before completing his studies, and worked as an itinerant church painter in the areas around Vorarlberg, Liechtenstein and Graubünden.

In 1867, when he arrived at the newly fashionable and growing spa town of Wiesbaden, he settled down to become a portrait painter. He also operated a small painting and drawing school. His most successful student there was Heinrich Schlitt.

He also began working as an illustrator, initially with several popular family magazines such as Über Land und Meer, the Fliegende Blätter and Die Gartenlaube. He occasionally wrote poetry and short prose works himself, under the pseudonym, "Karl Kurzum" (Karl In Short).

As his reputation grew, he was commissioned to do decorative works. One of his first involved frescoes at the Ratskeller in the New Town hall (1890), where he created humorous scenes with texts. A particularly notable assignment involved decorations at the Hessisches Staatstheater (1894), for which he was awarded the Order of the Red Eagle by Kaiser Wilhelm II.

He was married to Ida Bogler (1853–1931), a cousin of the architect, with whom Kögler associated for many years. They had a daughter, who died young, and a son who became an engineer. In turn, Bogler was married to Kögler's sister, Anna Maria.

In 1908, on the occasion of his seventieth birthday, a forest path was named after him. A street in Molsberg, near his birthplace, is also named for him. In 2004, a plaza with a fountain in Wiesbaden-Mitte was renamed the "Kaspar-Kögler-Platz".

References

Further reading 
 Kaspar Kögler, Heinrich Schlitt: Die Wandmalereien im Ratskeller zu Wiesbaden: 124 Abbildungen nach den Originalhandzeichnungen von Kaspar Kögler und Heinrich Schlitt mit begleitendem Text. Gebrüder Petmecky, Wiesbaden o. J. (c.1895)
 Woldemar Waldschmidt: "Kaspar Kögler (1838–1926)". In: Karl Wolf (Ed.): Nassauische Lebensbilder. Vol.3, Wiesbaden 1948, pp. 237–242.
 Marianne Fischer-Dyck: "Kaspar Köglers Malereien im Wiesbadener Ratskeller, Ein ehemaliges Werk – unwiederbringlich verloren". In: Wiesbadener Leben. #27, 4/1978, pp. 11 ff.
 Günther Kleineberg: "Kaspar Köglers Graphik für den „Verschönerungsverein Wiesbaden“ aus dem Jahre 1896". In: Wiesbadener Leben. #28, 10/1979, pp. 8 ff.
 Marianne Fischer-Dyck, Gretel Baumgart-Buttersack: "Geschichten aus dem alten Wiesbaden, Kaspar Kögler – 150 Jahre, und nicht vergessen ...." In: Wiesbadener Leben. 3/1988, pg.29.
 Martin Hildebrand: "Verkörperung des innerlich Guten und des charaktervoll Gediegenen, Als verläßlicher Chronist seiner Zeit ist der Maler und Dichter Kaspar Kögler noch zu entdecken". In: Wiesbadener Leben. #42, 2/1993, pg.6

External links 

 
 Illustrations from the Fliegenden Blätter @ HeidiCON
 Kaspar Kögler @ the Wiesbaden website
 His life and works @ the Kaspar Kögler website

1838 births
1923 deaths
20th-century German painters
20th-century German male artists
German illustrators
Decorative arts
Academy of Fine Arts, Munich alumni
German male writers
People from Westerwaldkreis
19th-century German painters
19th-century German male artists